WJ3 Records is an American independent jazz record label owned by WJ3 Productions, LLC, registered in New York and based in Brooklyn. The principal is Willie Jones III, a jazz drummer based in Brooklyn. WJ3 Productions was founded March 14, 2000.

Selected discography 
 Willie Jones III, Vol. 1...Straight Swingin''' (2001)
 Sherman Irby (alto sax), James Mahone (alto sax), Eric Reed (piano), Billy Childs (piano), Gerald Cannon (bass), Tony Dumas (bass), Willie Jones III (drums), Dwight Trible (vocal)

 Henry Franklin, Steve Katsuyama, Tony Austin, Sakura (2002)
 Willie Jones III, Vol. 2...Don't Knock The Swing (2003)
 Roy Hargrove (trumpet), Steve Davis (trombone), Greg Tardy (tenor sax), Eric Reed (piano), Gerald Cannon (bass), Willie Jones III (drums)

 The Banda Brothers: Tony Banda (bass), Ramon Banda (drums), Acting Up! (2004)
 Willie Jones III, Vol. III (2006)
 Eric Reed (piano), Willie Jones II (piano), Shanti Mathews (guitar), Dwayne Burno (bass), Mike Elizondo (bass), Willie Jones III (drums)

 Wycliffe Gordon (trombone, vocal), Eric Reed (piano, vocal), WE 2 (2007)
 Eric Reed (piano), Rodney Whitaker (bass), Willie Jones III (drums), Stand! (2009)
 Willie Jones III, The Next Phase (2010)
 Steve Davis (trombone), Greg Tardy (tenor sax), Warren Wolf (vibes), Eric Reed (piano), Dezron Douglas (bass), Willie Jones III (drums), Claudia Acuna (vocal), Renee Neufville (vocal)

 Eric Reed (piano), Reuben Rogers (bass), Rodney Green (drums), Something Beautiful (2011)
 Cyrus Chestnut, The Cyrus Chestnut Quartet (2012)
 Stacy Dillard (tenor sax), Cyrus Chestnut (piano), Dezron Douglas (bass), Willie Jones III (drums)

 Justin Robinson, In The Spur Of The Moment (2012)
 Roy Hargrove (trumpet), Justin Robinson (alto sax), Larry Willis (piano), Dwayne Burno (bass), Willie Jones III (drums)

 Willie Jones III Sextet, Plays The Max Roach Songbook (Live At Dizzy's Club Coca-Cola) (2013)
 Jeremy Pelt (trumpet), Steve Davis (trombone), Stacy Dillard (tenor sax), Eric Reed (piano), Dezron Douglas (bass), Willie Jones III (drums)

 Cyrus Chestnut, Soul Brother Cool (2013)
 Freddie Hendrix (trumpet), Cyrus Chestnut (piano), Dezron Douglas (bass), Willie Jones III (drums)

 Jacques Lesure, When She Smiles (2013) 
 Jacques Lesure (guitar), Eric Reed (piano), Mike Gurrola (bass), Willie Jones III (drums)

 Eric Reed (piano), Reflections Of A Grateful Heart (2013)

 Jacques Lesure, Camaraderie (2015)
 Jacques Lesure (guitar), Warren Wolf (vibes), Eric Reed (piano), Nat Reeves (bass), Tony Dumas (bass), Willie Jones III (drums)

 Willie Jones III, Groundwork (2016)
 Eddie Henderson (trumpet), Steve Davis (trombone), Stacy Dillard (tenor sax), Warren Wolf (vibes), Eric Reed (piano), Buster Williams (bass), Willie Jones III (drums)

 Willie Jones III, My Point Is (2017)
 Eddie Henderson (trumpet), Ralph Moore (tenor sax), Eric Reed (piano), Buster Williams (bass), Willie Jones III (drums)

 Jacques Lesure, For The Love Of You (2017)
 Jacques Lesure (guitar), Eric Reed (piano), Tony Dumas (bass), Willie Jones III (drums)

 Eric Reed, A Light In Darkness (2017)

 Ralph Moore, Three Score (2018)

 Justin Robinson, At First Light (2018)

 Rick Germanson, Turquoise Twice (2019)

 WJ3 All Stars, Lovers & Love Songs: The Ones You Forgot (2019)

 Teodross Avery, Harlem Stories: The Music of Thelonious Monk (2020)

 Isaiah J. Thompson, Plays The Music of Buddy Montgomery (2020)

 Gregory Tardy, If Time Could Stand Still (2020)

 Willie Jones III, Fallen Heroes'' (2021)

References 

Record labels established in 2000
American record labels
Jazz record labels